Michael Joseph Grimm (born December 30, 1978) is an American singer/songwriter and winner of the fifth season of America's Got Talent.

Personal life
Grimm was born in Colorado on the Fort Carson base, moved to Slidell, Louisiana, but later raised in Waveland, Mississippi by his grandparents.

During the AGT finals, he revealed that his girlfriend of nearly three years, Lucie Zolcerova, was the inspiration for his performance of "When a Man Loves a Woman". "She's been there for me," Grimm told DeGeneres during a taping of The Ellen DeGeneres Show which was aired on September 17, 2010. "Once you find that good woman you hang on to her." While interviewing him, DeGeneres called Lucie down from the audience, and Grimm got on one knee to propose. Her answer was a swift "Yes".

Grimm, a Mississippi Southern Soul singer who won the $1 million AGT first prize in its 5th season, used some of his winnings to build his grandparents a new house.

As of 2016, he resides in Henderson, Nevada.

America's Got Talent
Grimm auditioned in Los Angeles for the fifth season of America's Got Talent aired on June 1, 2010. His audition received praise from all three judges, advancing him to Vegas Week. During Vegas week, his performance of "Try a Little Tenderness" was criticized by Piers Morgan for being way over 90 seconds and could have gotten him disqualified. He still advanced to the quarterfinals. His quarterfinal performance, "Tired of Being Alone," was once again praised, and he advanced to the semifinals. Earlier in the show, Sharon Osbourne commented that her husband Ozzy Osbourne was rooting for Grimm. Grimm performed "You Can Leave Your Hat On" during semifinals while recovering from a dehydration related illness. Despite the illness, he managed to deliver a performance that was once again praised by the judges, and he advanced to the finals. After performing "Let's Stay Together" in the Top 10 without his guitar, he advanced to the Top 4.  In the finale on September 14, 2010, he performed "When a Man Loves a Woman" pointing to his girlfriend, Lucie, in the audience. The following day, it was revealed that Grimm won the show, beating child singer Jackie Evancho. Grimm went to America's Got Talent: The Champions in 2020 eliminated at Preliminary.

Performances and results

Post-AGT
Grimm's winnings included one million dollars (before taxes and reduction for lump sum payment) and the opportunity to headline the AGT Tour Show, including one show at Caesar's Palace in Las Vegas on October 8, 2010.  In September 2010, Grimm appeared on The Ellen DeGeneres Show and proposed to his girlfriend of nearly three years, Lucie Zolcerova.  The AGT Tour Show stopped in 25 cities, beginning October 1 and ending November 7, 2010, where Grimm performed with other top ten contestants of the fifth season of AGT.

On June 1, 2011, Grimm married his fiancée, Lucie Zolcerova, in a small private ceremony in Maui, Hawaii. The ceremony was held on the beach at the Makena Beach & Golf Resort in front of about 30  family members. Andres Delos Santos and Nate Martin from "Ten Feet" along with Kevin and Dawn Okimoto and Alex Pula entertained the party, backing the newlyweds as they serenaded each other with their favorite song, "Islands in The Stream." Bill Medley of The Righteous Brothers was in attendance.

Career
Grimm performed at Las Vegas, Nevada, casinos for eleven years prior to his AGT success.

2010 
On September 29, 2010, Michael signed a record deal with Epic Records. The album was released on May 17, 2011.

Grimm performed at the 2010 Macy's Thanksgiving Day Parade. On December 3, 2010, Grimm and Smokey Robinson raised over $1 million during the 37th Annual Candlelight Concert.

2011–present
On March 24, 2011, Grimm returned to The Ellen DeGeneres Show to promote his upcoming self-titled album and perform his newly released single (March 22, 2011) "Fallin'" written and recorded by Alicia Keys in 2002.  The album debuted at #13 on US Pop Music Charts on May 26, 2011,  selling 23,000 copies. According to the Billboard Top 200, his album was #13 the week of June 4, 2011.

Grimm performed on the Top Ten show of the sixth season of America's Got Talent on September 6, 2011.  Also in the summer an autumn of 2011, Grimm  opened for Stevie Nicks.

Discography

Albums

Singles

Music videos

References

External links

Video interview with Michael Grimm on Talktails (Vegas Video Network)
September 2012 feature about Grimm in Las Vegas Weekly

21st-century American singers
20th-century American singers
20th-century American male singers
21st-century American male singers
1978 births
America's Got Talent winners
American blues singers
Epic Records artists
Living people
Singers from Mississippi
People from El Paso County, Colorado
People from Waveland, Mississippi